The Ralph Waldo Emerson Indianapolis Public School #58 is a historic school building located on N. Linwood St. in Indianapolis, Indiana, United States.  It was built in 1907 according to a design by R.P. Daggett and Co.  It is a two-story, rectangular brick building on a raised basement in a simplified Classical Revival style.  Additions were made to the building in 1917, 1921 (by Elmer E. Dunlap), and 1967.

It was listed on the National Register of Historic Places in 2004.

References

School buildings on the National Register of Historic Places in Indiana
Neoclassical architecture in Indiana
School buildings completed in 1907
Schools in Indianapolis
National Register of Historic Places in Indianapolis
1907 establishments in Indiana